A Likeness in Stone is a British television crime drama serial, broadcast across two nights during September 2000 on BBC One. The serial stars Liam Cunningham as Detective Inspector Bill Armstrong, a retired cop who returns to service after the body of a student is discovered, 10 years after her disappearance. Determined to uncover the murderer, Armstrong seeks to go behind the call of duty to bring justice to the victim's family. The serial was based upon the novel of the same name by author J. Wallis Martin which was published in Hardback by Hodder and Stoughton (UK) 1997, and translated into several languages.

The serial co-starred Jonathan Firth, Andrew Lincoln, Ruth Jones and Cherie Lunghi. It was broadcast across two consecutive nights, on 11 and 12 September 2000. Reviews of the serial were favourable.

Cast
 Liam Cunningham as Bill Armstrong
 Jonathan Firth as Stephen Gilmore
 Andrew Lincoln as Richard Kirschman
 Ruth Jones as Joan Poole
 Cherie Lunghi as Merle Kirschman
 Rebecca Palmer as Helena Warner
 Nicholas Hewetson as DI David Rigby
 Jude Akuwudike as DC Levi Pryor
 Sara Griffiths as Fiona Wharby
 Kate Fahy as Dorothy Warner
 Katy Cavanagh as Cathy Wilson
 Andrew Hilton as Thomas Gilmore

Episodes

References

External links
 

2000 British television series debuts
2000 British television series endings
2000s British crime television series
2000s British drama television series
BBC television dramas
2000s British television miniseries
English-language television shows